Carl Township is one of twelve townships in Adams County, Iowa, United States.  At the 2010 census, its population was 149.

Geography
According to the USGS, it contains two cemeteries: Carl and Mount Zion.

References

External links
 US-Counties.com
 City-Data.com

Townships in Adams County, Iowa
Townships in Iowa